Alafia barteri is a plant in the family Apocynaceae.

Description
Its fragrant flowers feature a white corolla. Local traditional medicinal uses include as a treatment for malaria and rheumatism.

Distribution and habitat
Alafia barteri is native to an area of tropical Africa from Sierra Leone to Gabon. Its habitat is lowland forest from sea level to  altitude.

References

barteri
Plants used in traditional African medicine
Flora of West Tropical Africa
Flora of Cameroon
Flora of Gabon
Plants described in 1891
Taxa named by Daniel Oliver